Guise is a commune in France. Guise may also refer to:

People
The House of Guise, a prominent French ducal family
Counts and Dukes of Guise
Guise baronets, baronetcies in England and Great Britain
Guise (name), a list of people with the name Guise

Other uses
Canton of Guise, a canton in France that includes the commune
Guise dancing, a folk practice in Cornwall
Guise, one of the houses of Markham College
BAP Almirante Guise, two Peruvian Navy destroyers

See also
Aspley Guise, a village in England
Guise Beach, Saskatchewan
"Guise Will Be Guise", an episode of the TV show Angel